The Guoyu, usually translated Discourses of the States, is an ancient Chinese text that consists of a collection of speeches attributed to rulers and other men from the Spring and Autumn period (771–476). It comprises a total of 240 speeches, ranging from the reign of King Mu of Zhou (r. 956918) to the execution of the Jin minister Zhibo in 453. Guoyu was probably compiled beginning in the 5th century BC and continuing to the late 4th century BC. The earliest chapter of the compilation is the Discourses of Zhou.

Guoyu's author is unknown, but it is sometimes attributed to Zuo Qiuming, a contemporary of Confucius; although as early as Jin dynasty, Fu Xuan objected to that attribution of authorship.

Contents
Guoyu overlaps with the period, people, events in the Zuo zhuan. It comprises eight books covering the Zhou court and seven of the feudal states, divided into 21 chapters:

References

Citations

Sources

External links

 Guoyu Original text in Chinese
 Guoyu 《國語》 Chinese text with matching English vocabulary

Chinese classic texts
Chinese history texts
5th-century BC history books
Works of unknown authorship